Kosamkheda (कोसमखेड़ा)  is a village in Kareli Tehsil, located in the Narsinghpur District of Madhya Pradesh State, India. It is part of Jabalpur Division.

Kosamkheda is situated near Satpura mountain, which is 10 km away. Kosamkheda's sun rise time varies 13 minutes from IST.

Kosamkheda is a farming based village. Almost all of the people who live there do farming for a living. Most of the business in the village is the product of raw food, vegetables, fruits, oil-seed, and milk products (milk, khowa, butter and buttermilk).

Facilities

Education

Government primary school (GPS) 
Kosamkheda has only one primary school. It was established in 1954. The lowest class is first grade and the highest class in the school is fifth.

Government middle school (GMS)
Kosamkheda school was recognized by the Department of Education in 1961. The school is upper primary only. The lowest grade is 6th and the highest grade in the school is 8th.

Health services 
The village contains one sub-health center, one private dispensary and one animal health center.

Water 
In Kosamkheda village all houses are connected with water pipe lines. The village also contains over 20 hand pumps for drinking water. For farming, the village contains wells, tube wells, canals and a dam. There is also a water tank which was established in 2004.

In Kosamkheda Gram Panchayat, the number of hand pumps is 63.

Electricity 
Electricity was brought to the village in 1975.

Culture

The majority of the population in Kosamkheda are Hindus. The official language of Kosamkheda is Hindi. In addition, a local language known as Narsinghpuria is popular in the village.

Transport

Railway stations 
There is no railway station near to Kosamkheda in less than 10 km. The below stations are commonly used by villages living there.

Airports

References

External links
kosamkheda.com

Villages in Narsinghpur district